John Dunlop Shankly (4 November 1903 – 18 May 1960) was a Scottish professional footballer who played as a forward in the Scottish League and the Football League.

Personal life 
Shankly's brothers Alec, Bill, Jimmy and Bob all became footballers. After retiring from football, he returned to work as a miner. Shankly died at Glasgow Victoria Infirmary on 18 May 1960, after suffering a heart attack during the 1960 European Cup Final earlier that evening.

Career statistics

References

Scottish footballers
Footballers from East Ayrshire
Glenbuck Cherrypickers F.C. players
English Football League players
Portsmouth F.C. players
1903 births
1960 deaths
Association football inside forwards
Association football outside forwards
Scottish Football League players
Nithsdale Wanderers F.C. players
Luton Town F.C. players
Alloa Athletic F.C. players
Blackpool F.C. players
Greenock Morton F.C. players
King's Park F.C. players
Dalbeattie Star F.C. players